Live at the Knitting Factory may refer to a number of live concert releases by several musicians, usually referring to recordings at the New York music venue, the Knitting Factory. These include:
More Live at the Knitting Factory by Charles Gayle
Solo Sessions Vol. 1: Live at the Knitting Factory by John Legend
Live at the Knitting Factory (Roscoe Mitchell album)
Naked City Live, Vol. 1: The Knitting Factory 1989 by Naked City
Live at the Knitting Factory New York City by Telectu
John Zorn's Cobra: Live at the Knitting Factory by John Zorn